Puss Without Boots (Spanish:El gato sin botas) is a 1957 Mexican comedy film directed by Fernando Cortés and starring Germán Valdés, Martha Valdés and Nono Arsu.

Cast
 Germán Valdés as Agustín Tancredo (El Gato) / Don Victorio Tancredo  
 Martha Valdés as Laura del Castillo  
 Nono Arsu as Paco  
 Wolf Ruvinskis as Humberto Carrasco  
 Marcelo Chávez as Sargento Botija  
 José Pidal as Sansón 
 Pepe Ruiz Vélez as Comentarista 
 Julián de Meriche as Aladino  
 Américo Caggiano as Tamalito 
 Antonio Brillas as Señor Comisario 
 Carlos Bravo y Fernández as Reportero  
 Sara Cabrera as Josefina  
 Lupe Carriles as Vecina  
 Enrique Carrillo as Policía  
 Fernando Cortés as Director pelicula  
 Julio Daneri as Reportero  
 Javier de la Parra as Actor rechaza empleo  
 Gerardo del Castillo as Empleado estudio  
 Pedro Elviro as Hombre en estadio  
 Pepita González as Dalilah  
 Héctor Mateos as Empleado de los estudios  
 Rosa María Montes as Enfermera  
 Magda Monzón as Secretaria  
 José Ortega as Policía  
 Carlos Robles Gil as Espectador  
 Humberto Rodríguez as Villista  
 Miguel Suárez as Comandante

References

Bibliography 
 Carlos Monsiváis & John Kraniauskas. Mexican Postcards. Verso, 1997.

External links 
 

1957 films
1957 comedy films
Mexican comedy films
1950s Spanish-language films
Films directed by Fernando Cortés
Films scored by Manuel Esperón
1950s Mexican films